Fisera eribola, the orange-hooded crest-moth, is a species of moth of the family Geometridae. It was described by Edward Guest in 1887 and it is found in Australia.

References

Nacophorini